Worship is the third album from the noise rock band A Place to Bury Strangers. It is their first album for their new label Dead Oceans. "You Are the One" was released as a free download on April 2, 2012.

The track listing has been confirmed on the label's site.

Track listing

Charts

References

2012 albums
A Place to Bury Strangers albums
Dead Oceans albums